The Bonya River is a river in the American territory of Guam.

See also
List of rivers of Guam

References

Rivers of Guam